Michele Dell'Orco (born 7 September 1985) is an Italian politician. He was Undersecretary to the Ministry of Infrastructure and Transport from 2018 to 2019.

References 

Living people
1985 births
Deputies of Legislature XVII of Italy
Five Star Movement politicians